Westerland (Sylt) station is a terminus railway station in the town of Westerland, Schleswig-Holstein, Germany. The station lies on the Marsh Railway and the train services are operated by Deutsche Bahn and Nord-Ostsee-Bahn.

Station layout 

The station is located on a small square in the town's center. The station building's entrance is located on the side facing the square, the two island platforms are located on the building's backside.

To the left of the passenger platforms is a freight station; to the right is the car shuttle (Autozug Sylt) terminus.

Service

Trains 
The station is served by the following service(s):
intercity service (EC 27) Westerland (Sylt) - Hamburg - Berlin - Dresden

Route information:

See also 
 List of railway stations in Schleswig-Holstein

References

External links

Deutsche Bahn website
Nord-Ostsee-Bahn website

Railway stations in Schleswig-Holstein
Railway stations in Germany opened in 1927
Buildings and structures in Nordfriesland